The Special Achievement Award for Young Investigators in Applied Mechanics is an award given annually by the Applied Mechanics Division, of American Society of Mechanical Engineers (ASME).  The Award is presented at the Applied Mechanics Annual Dinner at the ASME Congress.  In 2008, this award was renamed to the Thomas J.R. Hughes Young Investigator Award.

Nomination procedure  
A letter of nomination, several letters of support, along with any other supporting materials, should be sent by email to the chair of the Executive Committee of the Applied Mechanics Division.  Nominees must not have reached their 40th birthday at the time of nomination.  See the list of current members of the Award Committee

Recipients

2019 – Yihui Zhang
2018 – Liping Liu and Dennis Kochmann
2017 – José E. Andrade
2016 – Pedro Miguel Reis
2015 – Thao (Vicky) D. Nguyen
2014 – Katia Bertoldi and Ryan S. Elliott
2013 – Wei Cai
2012 – Yuri Bazilevs, Xi Chen and Kenji Takizawa
2011 – Markus J. Buehler and Ioannis Chasiotis
2010 – Harley T. Johnson
2009 – Pradeep Sharma
2008 – Chad Landis
2007 – Assad Oberai
2006 – Jian Cao
2005 – George Haller and L. Mahadevan
2004 – Kaushik Bhattacharya
2003 – L. Cate Brinson
2002 – None Presented
2001 – Zhigang Suo
2000 – Pedro Ponte-Castaneda
1999 – Huajian Gao
1998 – Mary C. Boyce

See also

 List of mechanical engineering awards
Applied Mechanics Division
American Society of Mechanical Engineers
Applied mechanics
Mechanician

External links
Homepage of the ASME International Applied Mechanics Division

Awards of the American Society of Mechanical Engineers
Early career awards